Surda is a Palestinian town in the Ramallah and al-Bireh Governorate, located northeast of Ramallah in the northern West Bank. According to the Palestinian Central Bureau of Statistics (PCBS), the town had a population of 1,031 inhabitants in 2007.

Location
It is bordered by Al-Bireh and Dura al-Qar'  to the east, Jifna  to the north, Abu Qash to the west, and Ramallah and Al Bireh to the south. Surda is 838 meters above sea level.

History
Pottery sherds from the Byzantine and the Mamluk eras have been found here.

Ottoman era
The population was 10 households, all Muslim. They paid a  fixed  tax rate of 33,3% on agricultural products, such as  wheat, barley, olive trees, vineyards, goats and beehives, in addition to occasional revenues; a total of 1,660 akçe. Pottery sherds from the early Ottoman era have also been fond here.

In 1838, it was noted as the village  Surada, in the Beni Harith district.

An Ottoman village list of about 1870 indicated 13 houses and a population of 63, though  the population count included  men, only.

In 1882, the PEF's  Survey of Western Palestine (SWP) described Surdah as: "A small village on a hillside, with a garden to the south of it, and the spring 'Ain Jelazun on the east."

In 1896 the population of Surda was estimated to be about 108 persons.

British Mandate era
In the  1922 census of Palestine,  conducted by the British Mandate authorities, Surda  had a population of 125 Muslims, increasing in the 1931 census  to 179 Muslims, in 43 houses.

In  the 1945 statistics the population of Surda was 250 Muslims,  while the total land area was 3,726  dunams, according to an official land and population survey. Of  this,  1,002 dunums were used   for plantations and irrigable land, 1,244  for cereals, while 20 dunams were classified as built-up areas.

Jordanian era
In the wake of the 1948 Arab–Israeli War, and after the 1949 Armistice Agreements, Surda  came  under Jordanian rule.

The Jordanian census of 1961 found 415 inhabitants in Surda.

1967-present
After the Six-Day War in 1967,  Surda  has been under Israeli occupation.

After  the 1995 accords, 95.4% of village land has been defined as Area B land, while the remaining 4.6% is Area C.

Surda is the birthplace of the Palestinian diplomat Hasan Abdel Rahman.

Footnotes

Bibliography

External links
Surda genealogy: Family frees, Surda.net
Welcome To Surda
Survey of Western Palestine, Map 14:  IAA, Wikimedia commons 
 Surda (fact sheet),   Applied Research Institute–Jerusalem (ARIJ)
 Surda Village Profile,  ARIJ
Surda (aerial photo),  ARIJ
 Locality Development Priorities and Needs in Surda Village, ARIJ

Villages in the West Bank
Ramallah and al-Bireh Governorate
Municipalities of the State of Palestine